Steffie Spira (2 June 1908 – 10 May 1995) was an Austrian-born German stage, film and television actress. Spira was the daughter of actors Fritz and Lotte Spira. Her sister was actress Camilla Spira.

Her father was of Jewish descent, and died in a concentration camp during the Holocaust. Spira became a theatre actress during the Weimar Republic, and joined the German Communist Party in 1929.

Following the Nazi takeover of power, she fled into exile. After being interned by the French government at the Camp de Rieucros, she escaped to Mexico. Spira returned to Europe in 1947 and settled in East Germany. She became a leading stage actor at the Volksbühne and appeared frequently in East German film and television productions.

In 1989, Spira was a speaker at the large Alexanderplatz demonstration calling for the current East German government to step down.

Selected filmography
 The Great Mandarin (1949)
 Bürgermeister Anna (1950)
 Ernst Thälmann (1954–1955)
 Heimliche Ehen (1956)
 Thomas Müntzer (1956)
 Apple Trees (1992)

References

Bibliography

External links

1908 births
1995 deaths
Austrian people of Jewish descent
Austrian stage actresses
Austrian film actresses
Austrian silent film actresses
Austrian communists
Jewish emigrants from Nazi Germany
German stage actresses
German film actresses
German silent film actresses
German communists
Actresses from Vienna
20th-century German actresses
20th-century Austrian actresses
Austrian emigrants to East Germany